The Sabah Bugis United Party (abbrev: PBBS) is a political party in Malaysia that focuses on the welfare of Bugis people in Sabah. It was among the latest 20 new parties registration approved by the Registrar of Society (RoS) and received permission to operate as a political party in 2013.

See also 
 Politics of Malaysia
 List of political parties in Malaysia

References 

Political parties in Sabah
Political parties established in 2013
2013 establishments in Malaysia